Kulon (occasionally rendered Kulun) is an  extinct language of the Taiwanese aboriginal people that belonged to the Austronesian language family. Very little data is available for Kulon; the primary source is the 60 pages of Tsuchida (1985). Li (2008) follows Tsuchida in linking Kulon with Saisiyat, while Blust (1999) proposes it was more closely related to Pazeh

References

Formosan languages
Languages of Taiwan
Extinct languages of Asia
Languages extinct in the 2010s
2010s disestablishments in Taiwan